Aleko Point (Nos Aleko \'nos a-'le-ko\), also Aleko Rock, is a rocky point midway along the northeast Antarctic coast of Emona Anchorage in the east of Livingston Island, projecting 150m to the west of southwest.

A nameless 400m wide cove is indented for 250m to the north of northwest, with two chains of rocks extending 80m and 50m in a westerly direction.  The cove's head features three rocks which are awash at high tide, the westernmost one lying 320m north of Aleko Point, while a larger rock rising to over 4m is located 90m southeast of the point.

The point emerged during a recent glacier retreat and was first recorded in the Bulgarian recording of February 1995.  The rock was mapped from a topographic survey of the region made from December 8, 1995, to February 8, 1996.

Aleko is the name of a peak of Rila Mountain and a site on Vitosha Mountain, named after Aleko Konstantinov (1863–97), a prominent writer and proponent of wilderness exploration.

Location

See also
 List of Bulgarian toponyms in Antarctica
 Antarctic Place-names Commission

Maps
 L.L. Ivanov et al. Antarctica: Livingston Island and Greenwich Island, South Shetland Islands. Scale 1:100000 topographic map. Sofia: Antarctic Place-names Commission of Bulgaria, 2005.
 L.L. Ivanov. Antarctica: Livingston Island and Greenwich, Robert, Snow and Smith Islands. Scale 1:120000 topographic map.  Troyan: Manfred Wörner Foundation, 2009.

References
 Aleko Point. SCAR Composite Gazetteer of Antarctica
 Bulgarian Antarctic Gazetteer. Antarctic Place-names Commission. (details in Bulgarian, basic data in English)

Headlands of Livingston Island